The 2015–16 Oman Professional League Cup (known as the Mazda Professional Cup for sponsorship reasons) was the fifth edition of a domestic football competition held in Oman.

The competition features four groups of 3-4 teams (Group A and B featured 4 teams and Group C and D featured 3 teams), with the group stage winners entering the semi-finals stage. Groups featuring three sides played each other thrice so that each team could play 6 matches in the group phase.

The competition featured all the clubs playing in the top flight in the 2015–16 season.

The competition began on 5 September 2015, and concluded on 27 March 2016. On Sunday 27 March 2016, Al-Nasr S.C.S.C. were crowned the champions defeating Sohar SC 2-0 in the finals and hence winning the title for the first time.

Group stage

Group A

Group B

Group C

Group D

Quarter-finals

*The 2015 Oman Professional League Cup Quarter-final between Muscat Club and Fanja SC scheduled to be played on 22 December 2015 was called off and postponed to 4 January 2015 due to late arrival of ambulance on the match day

Semi-finals

Finals

Statistics

Top scorers

Top Omani Scorers

OFA Awards
Oman Football Association awarded the following awards for the 2015–16 Oman Professional League Cup season.
Top Scorer: Abdul Rahman Al-Ghassani (Fanja)
Fair Play Award: Al-Musannah SC

See also
2015–16 Oman Professional League
2015–16 Sultan Qaboos Cup

References

External links
2015-16 Oman Professional League Cup - GOALZZ.com

Oman Professional League Cup
Professional League Cup
Professional League Cup